Magic Shell is a dessert product produced by Smucker’s in the US, originally created as Ice Magic by Cottees in Australia, and sold in the UK as Bird's Ice Magic. It is a syrup that quickly hardens into a crispy shell when poured onto a cold surface, which is the origin of the product's name. The syrup is primarily designed for use on ice cream. It comes in several flavours, including chocolate, caramel, chocolate fudge, cupcake, cherry, and smores in addition to two unique flavours—One with chocolate, caramel, and pecans, which the company calls "Turtle Delight", and a flavour based upon the candy bars Twix, Hersheys, and Reeses.
Cherry flavored magic shell has been discontinued, as per Smuckers own website.

History
In Australia, where the product was first invented, it is made by Cottees; called Ice Magic, it is sold in chocolate, mint chocolate, honeycomb chocolate, and strawberry flavours. It is not to be stored in a refrigerator, as it may harden, and will not pour. If this should happen, however, the bottle can be microwaved (without the lid) or placed in hot water for a short time to return the contents to a desired pouring consistency.

In the UK, the product was available as Bird's Ice Magic.

The "shell" effect in Magic Shell is due to the presence of coconut oil and sunflower oil, both of which contain high amounts of saturated fat, and sugar, which produces a chocolate mixture which is solid at higher temperatures than would otherwise be the case with normal ice cream topping. Contrary to what many people believe, paraffin wax is not an ingredient of Magic Shell.

See also
 Bird's Custard
 List of dessert sauces

References

External links
Magic Shell at Smuckers' official website.
 Chow.com's explanation of how Magic Shell works.
A basic recipe to make your own Magic Shell coating with two simple ingredients told in photos.
How much is inside a bottle of magic shell?

Dessert sauces
Australian desserts